Reading Racers are a British motorcycle speedway team. Formed in 1968, they won four British League titles during their history. The club closed in October 2008 after the lease on Smallmead Stadium was sold and the site was demolished. In 2016 a group of supporters reformed the team and have subsequently gone on to gain a place in the newly founded Southern Development League winning their debut season undefeated in 2017.

History

1968–1974
The club was formed in 1968 and were founder members of British League Division Two. The team were originally based at the Reading Stadium (Oxford Road) until the stadium closed in 1973. In their final year the Racers won their first British League title. Swede Anders Michanek was in imperious form, going undefeated in home fixtures and finishing with a 11.36 average. In addition to Michanek the team was boosted by high scoring from Norwegian Dag Lövaas and Australian Geoff Curtis and supported by Peter Murray, Richard May, Mick Bell and Bernie Leigh. In a sensational finish to the 1973 Knockout Cup final Reading were beaten by Belle Vue in a run-off for the Cup after an aggregate draw over two legs.

1975–1996
Smallmead Stadium was constructed during 1974, near the site of a refuse tip close to Junction 11 of the M4 motorway. The Racers returned for the 1975 season, a crowd of 9,264 witnessed the opening meeting against Hull and Reading won the match by 18 points.  The club finished 6th that campaign and had an average crowd of almost 6,500 every meeting. Between 1976 and 1979 the crowd figures remained high, despite a poor 1978 when the club finished 14th out 19 teams.

The club enjoyed a successful 1980 season, winning the British League title and attracting crowds of over 7,000 on a regular basis. Reading's success came down to three strong heat leaders, Swedish champion Jan Andersson, their new American signing Bobby Schwartz and England international John Davis. All three produced season averages around the 10 mark, which enabled the team to constantly pick up victories. The club made headline news with a £40,000 insurance bond payment for winning the league title, which gained much media interest. However, behind the scenes unrest in the management structure saw major changes at the end of the season with Bill Dore taking control of the club with local businessman Frankie Higley. Dore's daughter Pat Bliss became more involved in the running of the speedway and Dore's son Martyn was tasked with the maintenance of the track and stadium. The club suffered the tragedy of losing their 25-year old American rider Denny Pyeatt, who suffered fatal head injuries during an away match at Hackney Hawks in July 1982. Despite tracking very competitive looking teams in the mid-1980s the club never achieved the dizzy heights of the start of the decade, until 1990 when the appointment of loyal fan Tim Sugar as the team manager saw the club win the league title in both 1990 and 1992, with top rider Per Jonsson also crowned world speedway champion in 1990. Jeremy Doncaster and their new Australian signing Todd Wiltshire topped the reading averages in 1990 and Jonsson averaged 10.04 in 1992. However, Jonsson suffered terrible injuries in a crash in Poland in 1994, and this had an adverse effect on the club and its fortunes. 1995 and 1996 were poor seasons for the club, as crowds dropped and media interest waned.

1997–2008
The 1997 season saw the club drop down to the second tier of the league for the first time since 1970. Although the Premier League name remained the same the top clubs formed the new Elite League. The decision not to join the Elite League brought some much needed success for the club as they were crowned champions that year, with Dave Mullett (who had been part of the championship winning teams in 1990 and 1992) proving to be the best rider in the league, the team subsequently won the double after winning the Knockout Cup. The period 1999 to 2003 were lean years for the club, which had seen veteran promoter Chris Shears and his son Ivan become part of the promotional set up.

By 2004, Ivan Shears had replaced team manager Sugar and the club showed signs of resurgence with a large sponsorship deal with local telecomms company Euphony Communications. This secured the funds for the signature of English rider Danny Bird and Slovenian Matej Žagar. Bird and Phil Morris (who replaced an injured Žagar) won the Premier League Pairs Championship in June of that season. 2005 was a disappointing season for Reading and by the end of the campaign there were signs that the club need new investment to survive. Consequently, the promotion sold the club to BSI Speedway in 2006. The new promotion took Reading into the Elite League and changed the club name to the Reading Bulldogs. Their first season was a huge success on track as the Bulldogs narrowly missed out on the title, losing by a single point to Peterborough Panthers in the play-off final. The success on track wasn't mirrored off track, as crowds were on average around 650 people short of the 2,000 required each meeting to break even, the fact that Smallmead Stadium had no seen no real investment to its infrastructure since it was built was a key factor in this, although many fans also blamed the changing of the club nickname from Racers to Bulldogs, a move which had seen a number of the hardcore fans of the club boycott meetings as a protest.

The majority of the successful 2006 team were retained for the 2007 season, but crowds dropped alarmingly, with some meetings being witnessed by less than 900 fans. This led to BSI deciding to put the club up for sale mid-season, which resulted in the club being purchased by Swindon-based businessman Mark Legg, who appointed ex-rider Malcolm Holloway as his co-promoter, with the astute Tim Sugar returning as Team Manager, whilst the club's press officer and webmaster Andy Povey was appointed to head up rider recruitment, marketing and commercial activities. It was confirmed at the time of the takeover that Reading would see out the remaining fixtures of the 2007 season in the Elite League.
the club also reverted to their original Reading Racers name. the new promotion and new change had little effect on the crowds and the new owners lost a reported six figure sum in the space of four months. 

The club opted to drop a division to the Premier League in 2008, the season was a traumatic time on and off track for the club. Povey and Holloway's team building decisions proved disastrous, with only Dane Ulrich Østergaard's performances saving their blushes on numerous occasions.  However performances on track were overshadowed by the news that the Smallmead Stadium lease expired in October 2008 and would not be renewed. A final farewell meeting was held on 19 October 2008, as a near capacity crowd of 3,200 including former Reading riders Anders Michanek, Jan Andersson, Bernie Leigh, John Davis, Richard May, Tony Olsson and Phil Morris witnessed Ulrich Ostergaard win the £3,000 winner's purse.

Return
In 2016 a group of supporters got together to bring back the team and following various meetings, in September 2016 the Reading Racers rode in a challenge match against Weymouth Wildcats. In the Winter of 2016, The Speedway Action Group showed their interest in entering the SDL Southern Development League. This league was given the go ahead from the Speedway Control Board and Reading Racers along with Weymouth, Plymouth, Kent and Exeter formed the SDL. The 2017 season was Reading's first back in a League since 2008, at an adopted home in Eastbourne. They were unbeaten during the season and the inaugural Southern Development League Champions. During 2018 the Racers contested the 2nd year of the Southern Development League to defend their title while remaining at Eastbourne for their home track. They finished runners up in the league. In 2019 they were given a chance to come closer to home by using Swindon as they home track. This season started well, but due to an injury to Sam Norris the team struggled to get a replacement and finished mid table. 

In 2019 the Reading Racers returned closer to home, they used Abbey Stadium for their home matches. After a good start to the 2019 season rider Sam Norris had a serious crash and was in intensive care with a brain injury. This shook the whole Racers team and management. The Racers didn't really recovery from this and finished the season mid table. After the 2019 season ended the Racers management Emma Stevens, Andy Griffin, Gene Carter and Mat Stevens started to plan for the 2020 season, they continued to make a number of contacts and leads to find a piece of Land in the Reading area ensuring the BSPA were kept up to date showing them details of progress which was asked for the previous season. Of which the Racers thought was sufficient as we were not asked for more from anyone from the SCB or BSPA. 

At the beginning of 2020 the team started to come together, only to be told by the BSPA that no nomadic teams could race unless they had their own track. So the Racers decided to take a break from the 2020 season to concentrate on following up plans to raise funds and find a Willing sponsor to build their Dream track back in the Reading area. After the Covid-19 outbreak the whole Speedway season was put on hold.

Stadium plans
With Smallmead Stadium's lease expiring in October 2008, the club announced plans for new stadium at Island Road, Reading. A new complex featuring greyhound racing, and a casino as well as speedway has been given the go ahead by the local council. The plans for the new stadium did not go ahead as agreed. The Promoter rights are now with the Reading Speedway Action Group who are seeking land in the Berkshire area to build a stadium, to bring Racers home. Their vision is to be in the Berkshire area by 2020.

Season summary

Season summary (juniors)

Notable riders

References

Defunct British speedway teams
Racers